Marie Te Hapuku (formerly Marie-Adele McArthur) is an operatic soprano from Gisborne, New Zealand, and is a direct descendant of the Māori chief, Te Hapuku., of the Ngāti Kahungunu tribe.

Life and career
She made her professional debut with Utah Opera as Hänsel in Engelbert Humperdinck's Hänsel und Gretel. She went on to sing in the San Francisco Opera's Merola Opera Program and gave notable performances in Western Opera Theater's national touring production of Die Fledermaus.

Te Hapuku has been the recipient of several awards and has won several major competitions including the Jay Darwin Memorial Award for the San Francisco Opera Auditions, the Sir Frank Tait Bursary award, the Willi Fels Memorial Trust, and the Sylvia Lerner and Wagner Society awards for the Metropolitan Opera National Council Auditions. Prestigious opera companies include the Metropolitan Opera, the Liceu, Sarasota Opera, Phoenix Opera, The NBR New Zealand Opera, Utah Festival Opera, Opera North, and OperaDelaware. Te Hapuku is also active as a concert recitalist and has appeared with several professional music ensembles including the Syracuse Symphony Orchestra, the Knoxville Symphony, the San Jose Symphony, the Brooklyn Philharmonic, Italo Marchini's Coro Lirico, the American West Symphony, the Brooklyn Symphony Orchestra, the New Zealand Chamber Orchestra, Queensland Pops Orchestra and Queensland Symphony Orchestra. McArthur has also performed at the New Hampshire Music Festival and with the Mormon Tabernacle Choir.

Te Hapuku was also one of three featured artists in a gala concert as part of the celebrations for the 2002 Winter Olympic Games. Te Hapuku holds dual citizenship in the United States and New Zealand, and currently resides in New York City.

Opera roles
 Abigaille, Nabucco (Verdi)
 Aida, Aida (Verdi)
 Amelia, Un ballo in maschera (Verdi)
 Donna Elvira, Don Giovanni (Mozart)
 Fiordiligi, Così fan tutte (Mozart)
 Leonora, Il trovatore (Verdi)
 Lina, Stiffelio (Verdi)
 Liù, Turandot (Puccini)
 Mimi, La bohème (Puccini)
 Rosalinda, Die Fledermaus (Johann Strauss II)
 Tosca, Tosca (Puccini)

Solo concert work
 Bach's Christmas Oratorio
 Beethoven's Symphony No. 9
 Handel's Messiah
 Handel's Judas Maccabaeus
 Verdi's Requiem

References

William Dart, Review: Don Giovanni at Aotea Centre, The New Zealand Herald, 16 July 2005.

External links
, Schubert's "The Omnipotence" with the Mormon Tabernacle Choir
, Lina from Verdi's Stiffelio
, traditional Maori folk song "Pokarekare Ana", unaccompanied

Year of birth missing (living people)
Living people
New Zealand emigrants to the United States
New Zealand operatic sopranos
People from Gisborne, New Zealand
Ngāti Kahungunu people
Singers from New York City
Māori opera singers